Concepción Bona Hernández, Mother Founder (December 6, 1824 - July 2, 1901) was a nursery school teacher and a campaigner for the independence of the Dominican Republic.  Together with María Trinidad Sánchez, Isabel Sosa and María de Jesús Pina, she took part in designing the Dominican flag.

Biography 
Concepción Bona was a daughter of Ignacio Bona Pérez, one of the signatories of the Manifesto of January 16, 1844, and Juana de Dios Hernández, who was the eldest daughter of Josefa Brea Hernández, wife of the patrician Matías Ramón Mella. The Haitian occupation of Santo Domingo began two years before her birth, and she grew up under Haitian rule.

When Jean-Pierre Boyer took possession of the Dominican territory in 1822, the result was a political and cultural clash between the two countries, since the cultural base of the Haitians was Franco-African, while that of the Dominican people was Hispanic. For this reason the country was placed under military repression under , who set about recruiting youths for the military service of the Dominican Republic.

Bona grew up in a family fully committed to the patriotic cause that followed the ideas of Juan Pablo Duarte. Young and brave, with her family she unconditionally adopted the Trinitarian ideas. Thus it was that together with her cousin, María de Jesús Pina, Isabel Sosa and María Trinidad Sánchez, using fine fabrics she made the tricolor flag that was hoisted by the independence supporters in Puerta del Conde on February 27, 1844. This marked the birth of the independent Dominican Republic. According to Dominican historians, it was Bona herself who brought the flag to General Matías Ramón Mella, founder of the country and the husband of her cousin Josefa Brea Hernández. Concepción Bona was aged 19 at the time and her cousin was 16.

Bona married Marcos Gómez y Carvajal, who was from Baní, on June 2, 1851. The couple had six children: Marcos Antonio, Manuel de Jesús, Eloísa, Rafael María, José María, and another José María. Concepción Bona died on July 2, 1901, in Santo Domingo. Her remains are preserved in the National Pantheon.

A metro station in Santo Domingo is named after her.

See also
 Dominican War of Independence

References

External links 
 Bilirrubina.com
 Opción Final.com
 Wiki Dominicana (La Enciclopedia Virtual)

1824 births
1901 deaths
Dominican Republic women
Dominican Republic independence activists
Flag designers